Swallowfield is a village and civil parish in Berkshire, England, about  south of Reading, and  north of the county boundary with Hampshire.

Geography
The civil parish of Swallowfield also includes the nearby villages of Riseley and Farley Hill, and is, in turn, within the Borough of Wokingham. Swallowfield has a site of Special Scientific Interest (SSSI) on the south western edge of the village, called Stanford End Mill and River Loddon The village has a local nature reserve called Swallowfield Meadow. Swallowfield Park is a stately home situated in an estate half a mile north east of the village. The current mansion has been converted into exclusive apartments.

Notable residents
Swallowfield has been the home of a number of famous persons including Thomas 'Diamond' Pitt, the Governor of Fort St. George; William Backhouse, the Rosicrucian philosopher; Henry Hyde, 2nd Earl of Clarendon; and, in his childhood, Edward Hyde, 3rd Earl of Clarendon. The 19th century author Mary Russell Mitford retired to the village and is buried in the churchyard.

References

External links

Swallowfield Parish Council
Swallowfield Parish Allotments
Royal Berkshire History: Swallowfield

 
Villages in Berkshire
Civil parishes in Berkshire
Borough of Wokingham